The Franklin Pearson House is a historic house located on Dodge Street in Keosauqua, Iowa and is a confirmed stop on the Underground Railroad.

Description and history 
Benjamin Franklin Pearson was a Maryland native who settled in Iowa in 1835 after it was opened to settlement. He had a storied service in the Union forces during the American Civil War.  Afterward, he returned to Iowa and became a master stone mason who built this house and other structures in southeastern Iowa, including Old Main at Iowa Wesleyan University.

He was a devout Methodist who hosted services on the upper floor of his house. Pearson was also an abolitionist and involved with the Underground Railroad. The home he built for his family in Keosauqua, Iowa in 1845 was a two-story structure, and is a rare vernacular Georgian style house in Iowa. Pearson imported the style from his native Maryland. The exterior of the first story is stone while the second is brick. Unbeknownst to those around him, he also included a hidden cellar.  It was there that slaves escaping the Confederacy were successfully hidden on their journey North.

A tornado in 1967 destroyed the chimneys and most of the brick from the east wall. Ironically, it was rebuilt using brick from a place of worship known locally in those days as the "Negro Church", a structure that had been destroyed in the same storm.  The church was a landmark dating back to a time during Reconstruction and well into the 20th century when the black population of Keosauqua was sizable. A gift, perhaps, to a man who helped them in their time of greatest need.

The house was listed on the National Register of Historic Places on May 22, 1978.

References

Houses completed in 1845
Keosauqua, Iowa
Georgian Revival architecture in Iowa
Houses in Van Buren County, Iowa
National Register of Historic Places in Van Buren County, Iowa
Houses on the National Register of Historic Places in Iowa